Parecag is a settlement next to Sečovlje in the Municipality of Piran in the Littoral region of Slovenia. Most of the Sečovlje saltworks lies in the area of Parecag.

Name
Parecag was attested in written sources in 1257 as Padriçagi, and in 1294 as Pareçagum and Padrecagum. The Slovenian name Parecag is borrowed from Italian Parezzago, which developed from Latin *Patriciācum, based on the personal name Patricius. Etymologically, the name means 'property owned by Patricius'.

References

External links
Parecag on Geopedia

Populated places in the Municipality of Piran
Slovenian Riviera